Harold Winston Rhodes (1905–1987) was a New Zealand university professor of English, writer and editor. He was born in Melbourne, Victoria, Australia in 1905.

References

1905 births
1987 deaths
New Zealand editors
New Zealand writers
New Zealand academics
Australian emigrants to New Zealand